Buskerfest is the name of a traveling festivals of buskers—street performers.  Buskers in the festivals visit a series of host cities each summer. Host cities often shut down one of more blocks of a prominent downtown street for the festival.

None of the cities had their festivals in 2020.

See also
 Busking Day

References

Festivals in Ottawa
Festivals in Toronto
Festivals in Kansas
Arts festivals in California
Festivals in Virginia
Performing arts in Toronto
Performing arts in Ottawa
Arts festivals in Ontario